Progress in Nuclear Energy is a monthly peer-reviewed scientific journal covering research on nuclear energy and nuclear science. It was established in 1977 and is published by Elsevier.

The current editors-in-chief are Yousry Azmy (North Carolina State University), Simon Middleburgh (Bangor University), and Guanghui Su (Xi'an Jiaotong University).

Abstracting and indexing
The journal is abstracted and indexed in:
 Chemical Abstracts Service
 Science Citation Index Expanded
 Current Contents/Engineering, Computing & Technology
 Scopus
According to the Journal Citation Reports, the journal has a 2021 impact factor of 2.461.

References

External links

Engineering journals
Elsevier academic journals
English-language journals
Monthly journals
Publications established in 1977